The Soft Whisper of the Dead is a horror novel by the American writer Charles L. Grant. It was first published in 1982 by Donald M. Grant, Publisher, Inc. in an edition of 2,800 copies, of which 300 were signed by the author and the artist. The book is the first volume of an internal trilogy which is part of Grant's Oxrun Station series.

Plot introduction
The novel concerns vampires in the Connecticut town of Oxrun Station, a suburb of New York.

References

Sources

1982 American novels
Vampire novels
Novels set in Connecticut
Donald M. Grant, Publisher books